The following is a list of legendary creatures recorded from Chinese mythology (中國神話动物清单).

A
 Ao, a mythological tortoise. 
 Ao Guang, the Dragon King of the East Sea.
 Azure Dragon, a dragon that represents the cardinal point East and Spring.

B

 Bai Ze, a cow-like monster with a human head, six horns and nine eyes.
 Baihu
 Bai Suzhen
 Bailongma
 Baku (mythology), a tapir-like creature that lives by eating people's dreams.
 Bashe, a python-like snake that ate elephants.
 Bixi, a dragon with the shell of a turtle. 
 Birds in Chinese mythology
 Black Tortoise, a turtle that represents the cardinal point North and Winter. 

 Bovidae in Chinese mythology

C

 Canshen
 Chi (mythology), a hornless dragon.
 Chinese guardian lions, traditional architectural ornaments. 

 Chinese dragon
 Chituma, steed of General Lü Bu.
 Chiwen, a dragon that protects fires, floods, and typhoons.
 Crane in Chinese mythology

D

 Denglong, a mythical creature that acts as messenger between heaven and earth.
 Dilong
 Dog in Chinese mythology
 Dragon (zodiac)
 Dragon King 
 Dragon turtle, mythical creature with head of a dragon and body of a tortoise which symbolises courage, power, and success.

F

 Feng (mythology), an edible monster that resembles a two-eyed lump of meat and magically grows back as fast as it is eaten.
 Fenghuang, Chinese phoenix 

 Feilian, god of the wind who is a winged dragon with the head of a deer and tail of a snake.
 Feilong, winged legendary creature that flies among clouds.
 Fish in Chinese mythology
 Four Perils
 Four Symbols, four legendary animals that represent the points of the compass.
 Fox spirit, a famous mythological fox-like creature with nine tails, known as the Kumiho in Korea and Kitsune in Japan. 

 Fuzhu, a Chinese deer with four horns, possessing a gentle countenance, a likeness to be clean, and usually appears during periods of flood.
 Fuzanglong, the dragon of hidden treasures.

H

 Huodou, a huge black dog that emits fire from its mouth. 
 Huli jing, see Fox Spirit.
 Hong (rainbow-dragon), two headed rainbow serpent.

J

 Jiangshi, a hopping zombie.
 Jiaolong, a hornless scaled dragon.
 Jin Chan, a prosperity toad. 
 Jingwei, a bird who is determined to dry up the sea. It was morphed from a girl who drowned in the sea. 
 Jiufeng, an earlier version of the Fenghuang.
 Jinnalaluo, divine creatures with human bodies and animal heads.
 Jueyuan (mythology), creatures that look similar to monkeys.

K

 Kalaviṅka, creatures with a human head and a bird's torso, with long flowing tail.
 Kui (Chinese mythology)

L

 Lake Tianchi Monster
 Linggui, a spirit turtle, chief of all shelled creatures.
 Longma, a winged horse with dragon scales.
 Longmu
 Luan (mythology), a bird which carries a shield and tramples on snakes while wearing one on its breast.
 Luduan, a deer with green coat, horse tail, and one horn which can travel 18,000 li in a single day and speaks all world languages.
 Lushu, a white headed horse with markings on its body like a tiger, a red tail, and a neigh like people singing folk songs.

M

 Mo (Chinese zoology)
 Mogwai (Chinese culture), evil spirits who reproduces during mating seasons triggered by the coming of rain.
 Moon rabbit, a mythical figure who is a companion of Chang'E and pounds the Elixir of Life constantly for her.

N

 Nian, a beast related to the Chinese New Year.
 Nine-headed Bird, see Jiufeng and Fenghuang.
 Nine sons of the Dragon

O

 Ox-Head and Horse-Face, two guardians of the underworld.

P

 Panhu, a dog who transformed into a man.
 Panlong (mythology), an aquatic dragon. 
 Peng (mythology), a mystical giant bird of the ocean.
 Penghou, a tree spirit. 
 Pixiu, strong winged lions that protect Fengshui practitioners.
 Pig dragon
 Pulao (dragon)

Q

 Qilin, a hooved dragon-like creature with antlers and the body of an ox, deer, or horse. 
 Qianlima, a winged horse that can run a thousand miles at a step.

 Qingniao, messenger birds of the Queen Mother of the West.
 Qiongqi, a winged tiger, one of the Four Perils.
 Qiulong

R

 Ruishi, Chinese guardian lions.

S

 Shen (clam-monster)
 Shenlong, a dragon who is the master of storms and also a bringer of rain.
 Shennong
 Shōjō
 Sky Fox (mythology), a golden Hulijing that has reached 1000 years of age.

T

 Taotie, a fiendish creature known for its greediness.
 Tenghuang, a fox with horns on its back or a horse-like creature.
 Teng (mythology), a flying dragon. 
 Three-legged crow 

 Three Corpses
 Tiangou, a dog which eats the moon, resulting in an eclipse.
 Tianma, a heavenly horse. 

 Tianlong
 Tiger in Chinese culture

W

 Wangliang
 White Tiger (mythology), a white tiger which symbolises the direction West and the season autumn.
 Winged unicorn

X

 Xiangliu, venomous nine-headed snake-like monster that brings floods and destruction.
 Xiao (mythology), name for multiple types of mythical creatures.
 Xiaotianquan, a mythological dog.
 Xiezhi, a creature which symbolises justice.
 Xingtian

Y

 Yaoguai
 Yinglong
 Yeren

Z

 Zhenniao, a legendary bird with poisonous feathers.
 Zhulong (mythology), a giant red solar dragon and god.
 Zhuque, a Vermilion Bird, one of the Four Symbols of the Chinese constellations.
 Zouyu
 Zhenniao

See also

 List of Chinese mythology
 Chinese deities
 Chinese gods and immortals
 Chinese mythology
 Korean mythology
 List of legendary creatures from Japan

Chinese legendary creatures
China
Chinese culture-related lists